Best of the Beast was Iron Maiden's first "best of" album, released in 1996 in three formats: a 34 track (four disc) vinyl, a 27 track (two disc) CD, a 16 track (single disc) CD and MiniDisc. The vinyl edition is, to date, the band's longest record release, running for over three hours.

Background

The track listing differs slightly between the various editions of the compilation album, but consists mainly of the band's singles and most well-known songs from their 1980–1995 albums. Also included are a new single, entitled "Virus", as well as previously unreleased live versions of "Afraid to Shoot Strangers" and "Revelations" (the latter exclusive to the vinyl edition). Both "Virus" and "Afraid to Shoot Strangers" had promotional music videos created, the latter of which was filmed during The X Factour with new lead vocalist Blaze Bayley replacing Bruce Dickinson, who sang the original studio recording.

The two-CD edition contains two songs from the band's 1979 demo tape/EP The Soundhouse Tapes ("Iron Maiden" and "Strange World," of which the latter was previously unreleased). The 4-disc vinyl pressing, meanwhile, contains the entire Soundhouse Tapes EP on its final side, again with the addition of "Strange World" from the same sessions. The vinyl edition has become quite rare and has increased in value steadily over the years in music stores and on online auction sites. The standard edition's value has not changed much although the Japanese pressings continue to rise in value.

Best of the Beast has long since been out of print and has been "replaced" by Edward the Great in most countries as a greatest hits package for the band.

The cover art was designed by Derek Riggs, known for having created most of Iron Maiden's early album covers. It is an amalgamation of his most famous works with the band, featuring Eddies from the Piece of Mind, Powerslave, Somewhere in Time and No Prayer for the Dying eras, as well as those from "The Trooper", Live After Death and a redesign of the Killers album cover.

Track listing

Standard edition CD and MD

Limited edition CD

Limited edition vinyl

Charts

Certifications

References

1996 greatest hits albums
Albums produced by Martin Birch
Albums produced by Wil Malone
EMI Records compilation albums
Heavy metal compilation albums
Iron Maiden compilation albums